Marie Davignon is a Canadian cinematographer and film director. She is most noted for her work on the 2020 film Beans, for which she received a Canadian Screen Award nomination for Best Cinematography at the 9th Canadian Screen Awards in 2021.

She was also previously a nominee for Best Cinematography in a Documentary at the 3rd Canadian Screen Awards in 2015, for her work on All That We Make (Fermières).

Her other cinematography credits have included the films Sashinka, Black Conflux and Niagara.

Her debut short film as a director, Girlfriends (Amies), was released in 2018.

References

External links

Canadian cinematographers
Canadian women cinematographers
Canadian women film directors
Film directors from Montreal
French Quebecers
Living people
Year of birth missing (living people)